The list of historic places in  the province of Prince Edward Island contains heritage sites listed on the Canadian Register of Historic Places (CRHP), all of which are designated as historic places either locally, provincially, federally or by more than one level of government.

The list has been divided by county and city boundaries for reasons of length.  See separate lists for the following geographic divisions:
Charlottetown
Summerside
Kings County
Queens County outside Charlottetown
Prince County outside Summerside

See also 

 List of National Historic Sites of Canada in Prince Edward Island
 Heritage Places Protection Act
 List of museums in Prince Edward Island